Dewitt Clinton Lewis (July 30, 1822–June 28, 1899) was a Union Army soldier who served in the 97th Pennsylvania Infantry Regiment during the American Civil War. Lewis received his country's highest award for bravery during combat, the Medal of Honor. Lewis's medal was won for his actions at the Battle of Secessionville on June 16, 1862. He was honored with the award on April 23, 1896.

Lewis was from West Chester, Pennsylvania.

Medal of Honor citation

He is interred at the Oaklands Cemetery in West Chester, Pennsylvania.

See also

List of American Civil War Medal of Honor recipients: G–L

References

1822 births
1899 deaths
American Civil War recipients of the Medal of Honor
Burials at Oaklands Cemetery
People from West Chester, Pennsylvania
People of Pennsylvania in the American Civil War
United States Army Medal of Honor recipients
United States Army officers